Line 1 of the Granada metro is a light rail line running from Albolote in the north to Armilla in the south, via Maracena and the center of Granada city. Today it has 26 stations and spans 15.920 km from end to end. 

In 2019 it received a total of 11.7 million passengers, which represents an increase of 15% compared to the previous year.

Route 

Line 1 is currently the only line in service in the Granada Metro network. Is entirely in double-track except for a small 730-meter stretch in the municipality of Armilla, where due to the urban layout it was arranged in a single track. 

The track gauge is 1,435 mm (international gauge). It is 15 923 meters long and has 26 stations.

The mixed-layout line consists of both underground and surface sections. In the latter, the infrastructure is integrated with the urban landscape of the city. The tracks are arranged on a segregated platform, decorated with cobblestones or grass.

Rolling stock 

Line 1 of the Granada Metro is composed by 15 trains Urbos 3 model, made by CAF. These have five modules with a total length of 32 meters and capacity for 200 passengers each.

Stations 

The line serves the following stations:

Future 

There are currently two extensions scheduled for line 1 of the Granada metro through its northern and southern terminus. In 2019, the Government of Andalusia approved a preliminary draft of two extensions. Also, they  approved the study for the creation of a second line that would run through the central part of the capital.

Southern expansion 

On November 12, 2021, the Andalusian government approved the southern extension of Granada Metro line 1 from Armilla to Churriana de la Vega and Las Gabias. The new 6.8-kilometer route will involve an investment of 68 million euros, which will be partially financed by Next Generation EU funds from the European Union, after the project has been selected as eligible for them.

It will be the first expansion of the original line. The works will start at spring 2023 and its completion is scheduled for 2026.

Northern expansion 

On June 20, 2021, the Government of Andalusia approved the expansion of the northern terminus from Albolote to Atarfe. This extension is in draft phase, and neither its final route nor the number of stations have yet been defined. 

The government confirmed it will arrive at least to the municipality of Atarfe, but is not yed defined if it will be extended beyond it.

See also
 Granada Metro
 Granada

References

External links

 Metropolitano de Granada

01 (Granada Metro)
Railway lines opened in 2017
2017 establishments in Spain